Anchorsholme is a suburb in Blackpool, in the ceremonial county of Lancashire, England, situated south of the Cleveleys and Blackpool border. It is a ward in the unitary authority of Blackpool since 1974, Local Government Act 1972. However, despite being in the Blackpool district and generally being considered a suburb of the town, it is in the Thornton-Cleveleys postcode area.

Etymology
The name Anchorsholme is thought to derive from the Old Scandinavian word 'holmr' meaning a piece of dry ground in a marsh forming an island, with the 'Anchors' meaning a location where one would fasten up a boat.

Council
It has two Conservative councillors, Councillor Tony Williams and Councillor Michael Jebson who were elected in 2007 local elections. Councillor Tony Williams is the first representative from Anchorsholme to be appointed to a cabinet position on Blackpool Council. In the 2011 local elections, Councillor Michael Jebson was replaced by Conservative Councillor Paul Galley in 2011. Both Councillors retained their seats in 2015. Cllr. Tony Williams became Leader of the Conservative Group on Blackpool Council in 2014.

Sports 
Anchorsholme has two sports team. Anchorsholme Football Club compete in the Mid Lancashire Football League Premier Division and Anchorsholme Cricket Club compete in the Fylde Cricket League.

Notable people

John Robb, pop music journalist, author and rock musician, grew up in Anchorsholme.

References 

Populated places in Lancashire
Geography of Blackpool